Schoenus calcatus is a species of Cyperaceae endemic to Western Australia.

Description
S. calcatus is a small cushion-forming perennial. The leaves are spirally arranged and have both a short blade and a short sheath.

Taxonomy
Schoenus calcatus was first described in 1997 by Karen Wilson. There are no synonyms. The specific epithet calcatus, is derived from the Latin verb, 'to tread upon' or 'walk over' and refers to a potential threat to the species.

Gallery

References

External links 

 Schoenus calcatus occurrence data from the Australasian Virtual Herbarium

calcatus
Flora of Western Australia
Plants described in 1997
Taxa named by Karen Louise Wilson